Ursula Küper (later Stille, born 28 November 1937) is a retired German swimmer. In 1960, she set a world record in the 100 m breaststroke. The same year she competed at the 1960 Summer Olympics and won a bronze medal in the 4 × 100 m medley relay. Two years later she won a bronze medal in the 200 m breaststroke at the 1962 European Aquatics Championships. She finished eighth in this event at the 1964 Olympics.

Her stepdaughter Antje Stille competed in swimming at the 1976 Olympics; Küper is married to her father Peter Stille.

References

1937 births
Living people
Swimmers from Berlin
German female swimmers
German female breaststroke swimmers
Olympic swimmers of the United Team of Germany
Swimmers at the 1960 Summer Olympics
Swimmers at the 1964 Summer Olympics
Olympic bronze medalists for the United Team of Germany
Olympic bronze medalists in swimming
European Aquatics Championships medalists in swimming
Medalists at the 1960 Summer Olympics